Caroline Atkinson (born in 1952), is an American economist, politician and former journalist. In 2013, she had been the Deputy Assistant to 44th US president, Barack Obama, and was his Deputy National Security Advisor for International Economic Affairs.

Biography

Caroline Atkinson was born in Washington DC in 1952, and was raised in London, United Kingdom. Her father was the UK's chief economist at the time.

Atkinson graduated from Oxford University with a bachelor's degree in philosophy, politics and economics (PPE).

She began her career as a journalist for the Washington Post, The Economist and the Times of London.

From 1994 to 1996 she worked as a special advisor on financial stability and market regulation at the Bank of England.

In Bill Clinton's second cabinet, she was responsible for international monetary and financial policy at the United States Treasury Department from 1997 to 2001 and was also an advisor to the then Treasury Secretary Robert Rubin and Larry Summers.

In the years up to 2003 she worked as a senior partner in the Council on Foreign Relations.

From 2003 to 2005 she was Senior Director at the investment advisory firm Stonebridge International LLC.

In 2005, she moved to the International Monetary Fund, where she was Director of External Relations from November 1, 2008, to July 2011. Before that, Atkinson held various positions, most recently as deputy director for the Western Hemisphere.

At the beginning of President Obama's first presidency in 2009, she was highly regarded as a potential Secretary of State for International Affairs in the Treasury - although she showed little interest.

Political career

Since August 2011, she has served President Obama as Special Assistant for International Economic Relations. During this time she played a central role in the Obama administration's response to the crisis in Europe. She supported the work of the G-8 and G-20 and cited integration efforts as an economic response to the Arab Spring.

On June 21, 2013, US President Barack Obama appointed Atkinson to be Deputy Assistant and Deputy National Security Advisor for Foreign Trade. She took over these tasks from Michael Froman, who had recently been appointed US trade representative.

In that role, she personally represents Obama at major international business summits, including the G-8 and G-20. As part of this task, she coordinates the political processes and is responsible for their implementation in the areas of international economic relations, including finance, trade and investment, development, as well as energy and environmental protection.

Her first task - in the week she took office - was to prepare the G-8 summit 2013 in Lough Erne (Fermanagh, Northern Ireland) as a so-called Sherpa and to discuss topics such as tax havens and proposals for trade taxation.

On March 20, 2014, Russia imposed entry bans on Atkinson and 8 other Americans as a countermeasure to the US sanctions in the context of the Russo-Ukrainian War.

Voices on their calling

On her inauguration, Barack Obama was quoted as saying, “Caroline is going around the world for her understanding of how the global economy works, for her persistent efforts to promote strong, balanced and sustainable growth, and for her management experience in dealing with international financial crises respected."

Former US Treasury Secretary Timothy Geithner said in advance: “Caroline is a seasoned veteran on the international stage. Well versed in the nuances of politics and the craft of diplomacy, she will be an excellent advisor to the President in her new role."

Mohamed El-Erian, executive director of Pacific Investment Management Company, which manages the world's largest fixed income fund, described the situation as follows: “It is very important for the United States to have someone like Caroline in this role. We will experience a major global realignment, the economic interaction will change, geopolitics will play a significantly larger role and multilateral institutions will not stop shaking the ground."

International Monetary Fund Assistant Director David Lipton said: “Caroline will need to broaden its range of what she has been doing - macroeconomic affairs - and come up with an expanded portfolio. She knows all technical issues, she knows the world and she will show that she can deliver."

References

1952 births
Living people